An outdoor bronze sculpture of American president Chester A. Arthur by artist George Edwin Bissell and architect James Brown Lord is installed at Madison Square Park in Manhattan, New York. Cast in 1898 and dedicated on June 13, 1899, the statue rests on a Barre Granite pedestal.

See also

 1899 in art
 List of sculptures of presidents of the United States

References

External links
 

1899 establishments in New York City
1899 sculptures
Bronze sculptures in Manhattan
Cultural depictions of Chester A. Arthur
Monuments and memorials in Manhattan
Outdoor sculptures in Manhattan
Sculptures of men in New York City
Statues in New York City
Arthur, Chester A.
Flatiron District